Waialae Country Club: True Golf Classics is a golf video game developed by T&E Soft and published by Nintendo for the Nintendo 64 in 1998. It is part of the True Golf Classics series (New 3D Golf Simulation in Japan) Although set at the same real life golf course, it is a different game than True Golf Classics: Waialae Country Club, released in 1991 for the Super NES. It was preceded by the game Masters '98: Haruka Naru Augusta, which was released in Japan in 1997; although both have very similarly styled graphics and gameplay, they are set at different golf courses. The game gained speedrunning notoriety in March 2021 after YouTuber Kurtis Conner made a video in which he broke the world record speedrun time.

Summary
Waialae Country Club: True Golf Classics is set in the eponymous Waialae Country Club in East Honolulu, Hawaii. There are six gameplay modes: Waialae Open, tournament play, stroke play, match play, skins play, and practice mode.

Reception

IGN stated that the gameplay was that of a "formula golf game" with nothing extraordinary. The graphics received negative reviews, citing how poor the graphics were for how late the game was released in the Nintendo 64's life cycle. Matt Casamassina of IGN said that the sound was "not bad", with crowd cheers, positive commentary after a good hit, and sympathetic commentary when a player isn't doing so well.

References

See also
 Eikō no Saint Andrews Japanese Exclusive Nintendo 64 golf game.
 Mario Golf, a Nintendo 64 golf game.

1998 video games
Golf video games
Nintendo 64 games
Nintendo 64-only games
Nintendo games
T&E Soft games
Video games developed in Japan
Video games set in Hawaii